Sapindoideae is a subfamily of flowering plants in the soapberry family, Sapindaceae. It includes a number of fruit trees, including lychees, longans, rambutans, and quenepas.

Genera
Genera include:

References

Rosid subfamilies
Sapindaceae